Roland Moser (born 19 September 1962) is a retired Liechtensteiner football midfielder. He was awarded the Liechtensteiner Footballer of the Year title in 1995. Besides Liechtenstein, he has played in Switzerland.

References

1962 births
Living people
Liechtenstein footballers
FC Vaduz players
USV Eschen/Mauren players
Association football midfielders
Liechtenstein international footballers